Sidy Koné (born 6 June 1992), also known as Sidi Koné, is a Malian professional footballer who plays as a defensive midfielder. He has been compared to Mali national team captain Mahamadou Diarra by Lyon's special advisor Bernard Lacombe.

Club career 
Born in Bamako, Koné joined Lyon in 2010 after playing for Jeanne d'Arc Bamako in his home country. He spent the 2010–11 season playing on the club's reserve team in the Championnat de France amateur, the fourth level of French football. He appeared in 13 matches, scoring one goal as the team won the league's reserves' title. Ahead of the 2011–12 season, Koné was promoted to the senior team permanently by new manager Rémi Garde and was assigned the number 22 shirt. He made his professional debut on 20 August 2011 in a 1–1 league draw with Brest. In the match, Koné received his first professional red card.

Koné spent the second half of the 2012–13 season on loan at Stade Malherbe Caen in Ligue 2. He did not make an appearance.

In May 2017, he trialled with Chamois Niortais.

In August 2018, Koné joined French seventh-tier side Thonon Évian F.C.

International career 
Koné is a former Mali youth international. He played at under-20 level, participating in qualification matches for the 2011 African Youth Championship and the tournament itself. Despite helping the team to a fourth-place finish at the competition, Koné was not included in the team for the 2011 FIFA U-20 World Cup. On 4 August 2011, he was called up to the senior team for the first time for a friendly match against Tunisia. Koné earned his first cap in the match, which ended in a 4–2 defeat, appearing as a second-half substitute for Sambou Yatabaré.

References

External links 
 
 
 
 

1992 births
Living people
Sportspeople from Bamako
Association football midfielders
Malian footballers
Olympique Lyonnais players
Stade Malherbe Caen players
Ligue 1 players
Ligue 2 players
Mali international footballers
Malian expatriate footballers
Expatriate footballers in France
2012 Africa Cup of Nations players
21st-century Malian people